In measure theory, projection maps  often appear when working with product (Cartessian) spaces: The product sigma-algebra of measurable spaces is defined to be the finest such that the projection mappings will be measurable. Sometimes for some reasons product spaces are equipped with -algebra different than the product -algebra. In these cases the projections need not be measurable at all.

The projected set of a measurable set is called analytic set and need not be a measurable set. However, in some cases, either relatively to the product -algebra or relatively to some other -algebra, projected set of measurable set is indeed measurable.

Henri Lebesgue himself, one of the founders of measure theory, was mistaken about that fact. In a paper from 1905 he wrote that the projection of Borel set in the plane onto the real line is again a Borel set. The mathematician Mikhail Yakovlevich Suslin found that error about ten years later, and his following research has led to descriptive set theory. The fundamental mistake of Lebesgue was to think that projection commutes with decreasing intersection, while there are simple counterexamples to that.

Basic examples

For an example of a non-measurable set with measurable projections, consider the space  with the -algebra  and the space  with the -algebra  The diagonal set  is not measurable relatively to  although the both projections are measurable sets.

The common example for a non-measurable set which is a projection of a measurable set, is in Lebesgue -algebra.

Still one can see that  is not the product -algebra  but its completion.

Measurable projection theorem

The following theorem gives a sufficient condition for the projection of measurable sets to be measurable.

Let  be a measurable space and let  be a polish space where  is its Borel -algebra. Then for every set in the product -algebra  the projected set onto  is a universally measurable set relatively to 

An important special case of this theorem is that the projection of any Borel set of  onto  where  is Lebesgue-measurable, even though it is not necessarily a Borel set.

See also

References

External links

 "Measurable projection theorem", PlanetMath

Descriptive set theory
Measure theory